Guillermo Díaz Gea (born 16 February 1944) is a Mexican politician from the Institutional Revolutionary Party. He has served as Deputy of the LV and LVIII Legislatures of the Mexican Congress representing Veracruz. He also served in the XLII Legislature of the Congress of Veracruz, as well as municipal president of his hometown of Pánuco.

References

1944 births
Living people
Politicians from Veracruz
Members of the Congress of Veracruz
Municipal presidents in Veracruz
Institutional Revolutionary Party politicians
20th-century Mexican politicians
21st-century Mexican politicians
People from Pánuco, Veracruz
Universidad Veracruzana alumni
Deputies of the LVIII Legislature of Mexico
Members of the Chamber of Deputies (Mexico) for Veracruz